Ganeshraj Narvekar (born 28 February 1993) is an Indian cricketer. He made his Twenty20 debut for Goa in the 2016–17 Inter State Twenty-20 Tournament on 29 January 2017.

References

External links
 

1993 births
Living people
Indian cricketers
Goa cricketers
People from Mapusa
Cricketers from Goa